Southeast Fairbanks Census Area is a census area located in the U.S. state of Alaska. As of the 2020 census, the population was 6,808, down from 7,029 in 2010. It is part of the unorganized borough and therefore has no borough seat. Its largest communities are Deltana and Tok, both unincorporated CDPs.

Geography
For comparison, it is slightly bigger than the state of West Virginia.

Adjacent boroughs and census areas
 Fairbanks North Star Borough, Alaska – Northwest
 Yukon-Koyukuk Census Area, Alaska – North
 Copper River Census Area, Alaska – South
 Matanuska-Susitna Borough, Alaska – Southwest
 Denali Borough, Alaska – West
 Yukon Territory, Canada – East

National protected areas
 Tetlin National Wildlife Refuge (part)
 Wrangell-St. Elias National Park and Preserve (part)
 Wrangell-Saint Elias Wilderness (part)
 Yukon-Charley Rivers National Preserve (part)

Demographics

As of the census of 2000, there were 6,174 people, 2,098 households, and 1,506 families living in the census area.  The population density was 0.25 people per square mile (0.01/km2).  There were 3,225 housing units at an average density of 0.13/sq mi (0.05/km2).  The racial makeup of the census area was 78.99% White, 1.98% Black or African American, 12.71% Native American, 0.68% Asian, 0.15% Pacific Islander, 0.73% from other races, and 4.76% from two or more races.  2.70% of the population were Hispanic or Latino of any race. 4.29% reported speaking an Athabaskan language at home, while 4.02% speak Russian, 3.76% Ukrainian, and 2.34% Spanish.

Of the 2,098 households, 39.40% had children under the age of 18 living with them, 58.20% were married couples living together, 8.60% had a female householder with no husband present, and 28.20% were non-families. 23.50% of households were one person, and 5.50% were one person aged 65 or older.  The average household size was 2.80 and the average family size was 3.34.

In the census area, the population was spread out, with 32.80% under the age of 18, 7.60% from 18 to 24, 27.80% from 25 to 44, 25.70% from 45 to 64, and 6.10% 65 or older.  The median age was 34 years. For every 100 females, there were 107.20 males.  For every 100 females age 18 and over, there were 108.60 males.

2020 Census

Communities

Cities
Delta Junction
Eagle

Census-designated places

Alcan Border
Big Delta
Chicken
Deltana
Dot Lake
Dot Lake Village
Dry Creek
Eagle Village
Fort Greely
Healy Lake
Northway
Northway Junction (former)
Northway Village (former)
Tanacross
Tetlin
Tok
Whitestone

See also
List of airports in the Southeast Fairbanks Census Area

References

External links
 Census Area map, 2000 census: Alaska Department of Labor
 Census Area map, 2010 census: Alaska Department of Labor

 
Alaska census areas